Captured is Journey's first live album. It was released on January 30, 1981 on the Columbia Records label. The album reached No. 9 on the Billboard 200 albums chart and went on to sell two million copies.

This album was recorded during the band's "Departure" tour in 1980. Tracks 1 to 4 were taken from a performance recorded at The Forum in Montreal, Quebec, Canada on August 8, 1980. Tracks 5 & 6 were from the performance at the end of the tour in Koseinenkin Hall, Shinjyuku, Tokyo, Japan on October 13, 1980 and tracks 7 to 16 came from two shows at Cobo Hall in Detroit, Michigan on August 4 & 5th 1980. The song "Dixie Highway" had not previously been (nor was it subsequently) recorded on any Journey studio album. Closing the album is the lone studio track, "The Party's Over (Hopelessly in Love)", which was released as a single.

In the liner notes, the album is dedicated to AC/DC lead singer Bon Scott, who died in February 1980. Scott is referred to as "a friend from the highway," as AC/DC had supported Journey the previous year on their "If You Want Blood" tour.

This was the last Journey album for keyboard player and founder Gregg Rolie.

Record World called the single "The Party's Over (Hopelessly in Love)" a "shining testimony to the band s commanding stage presence."

Track listing

Note: this was not the full concert set list that was played during the tour. The missing songs include "Of a Lifetime", "Kohoutek", "Lovin' You Is Easy", "People and Places", "Patiently", "Opened the Door", "Precious Time", "I'm Cryin'", "Homemade Love", "Moon Theme" (intro to "Wheel in the Sky") and "Winds of March".  "Majestic" is a recorded version played as the introduction of the band arriving on stage.

Personnel
Band members
Steve Perry - lead vocals
Neal Schon - guitar, vocals
Gregg Rolie - keyboards, vocals
Ross Valory - bass, vocals
Steve Smith - drums, percussion

Additional musicians
Stevie "Keys" Roseman - acoustic piano and keyboards on "The Party's Over (Hopelessly in Love)"

Production
Kevin Elson - producer, engineer, mixing, live sound
Clifford Bonnell, Daniel Aumais, Guy Charbonneau, Akira Fukuda, Tom Suzuki - live recordings assistant engineers
Wally Buck - studio recording assistant engineer
Bob Ludwig - mastering

Charts 
 

Album

Singles

Certifications

References

Journey (band) live albums
1981 live albums
Columbia Records live albums
Albums produced by Kevin Elson